The title Baron Tewkesbury has been created twice, once in the Peerage of Great Britain, and once in the Peerage of the United Kingdom.

 in 1706 as a subsidiary title of the Duke of Cambridge
 in 1831 as a subsidiary title of the Earl of Munster

Extinct baronies in the Peerage of the United Kingdom
British and Irish peerages which merged in the Crown
Noble titles created in 1706
Noble titles created in 1831